Mount Hermon is a census-designated place (CDP) in Pittsylvania County, Virginia, United States. The population as of the 2010 Census was 3,966.

Mount Hermon is located approximately 3 miles northwest of the city limits of Danville, Virginia.

References

Unincorporated communities in Virginia
Census-designated places in Pittsylvania County, Virginia
Census-designated places in Virginia